The Burhanuddin Harahap was an Indonesian cabinet, named after the Prime Minister, that served from 11 August 1955 until 3 March 1956.

Composition

Cabinet Leadership
Prime Minister: Burhanuddin Harahap (Masyumi Party)
First Deputy Prime Minister: R. Djanoe Ismadi (PIR-Hazairin)
Second Deputy Prime Minister: Harsono Tjokroaminoto (Indonesian Islamic Union Party - PSII)

Cabinet Members
Minister of Foreign Affairs: Ide Anak Agung Gde Agung (Democrat)
Minister of Home Affairs: Soenarjo (Nahdlatul Ulama - NU)
Minister of Defense: Burhanuddin Harahap (Masyumi)
Minister of Justice: Lukman Wiriadinata (Socialist Party of Indonesia - PSI)
Minister of Information: Sjamsuddin Sutan Makmur (PIR-Hazairin)
Minister of Finance: Sumitro Djojohadikusumo
Minister of Agriculture: Mohammad Sardjan (Masyumi)
Minister of Economic Affairs: Ignatius J. Kasimo
Minister of Transport: F. Laoh (PRN)
Minister of Public Works and Power: R. P. Soeroso (Parindra)
Minister of Labor: Iskander Tedjasukmana (Labour Party)
Minister of Social Affairs: Soedibjo (Indonesian Islamic Union Party - PSII)
Minister of Education & Culture: Soewandi (Parindra)
Minister of Religious Affairs: Mohammad Iljas (Nahdlatul Ulama - NU)
Minister of Health: Dr. Johannes Leimena (Parkindo)
Minister of Agrarian Affairs: Gunawan (PRN)
State Minister: Abdul Hakim (Masyumi Party)
State Minister: Sutomo (PRI)
State Minister: Coomala Noor (PIR-Hazairin)
Junior Minister of Transport: Asraruddin (Labour Party)

Changes
On 19 January 1956, both ministers from the PSII, namely Second Deputy Prime Minister Harsono Tjokroaminoto and Minister of Social Affairs Soedibjo, resigned, as did both NU ministers, namely Minister of Home Affairs Soenarjo and Minister of Religious Affairs Mohammad Iljas. Sutomo also became ad interim Social Minister, Minister of Public Works and Power R. P. Soeroso also became ad interim Interior Minister and Minister of Agriculture: Mohammad Sardjan also became ad interim Religious Affairs Minister.

References
 
 

Cabinets of Indonesia
Liberal democracy period in Indonesia
1955 establishments in Indonesia
1956 disestablishments in Indonesia
Cabinets established in 1955
Cabinets disestablished in 1956